Tegnér or Tegner is a Swedish surname. Notable people with the surname include:

 Alice Tegnér, composer of children's songs
 Esaias Tegnér, poet
 Esaias Tegnér Jr.,linguist
 Hans Tegner, Danish artist
 Mathias Tegnér (born 1979), Swedish politician
 Rudolph Tegner, Danish sculptor
 Torsten Tegnér, Swedish athlete

See also
 Tegner (disambiguation)

Swedish-language surnames